Bigstock is an online royalty-free, international microstock photography website that sells images via a credit-based system. Bigstock's photos, vectors and illustrations cost from between 1 and 6 credits each, depending on size, with credits ranging from $.90 to US$3.00. 
BigStockPhoto was founded in Davis, California, in the fall of 2004. Bigstock adds to its library every day as photographers and designers from around the world submit their work. As of June 2015, Bigstock had more than 25 million royalty-free images (photos, vectors and illustrations) available.

On September 23, 2009, Bigstock announced that it had been purchased by Shutterstock, a subscription-based microstock company.

See also 
Stock photography
:Category:Stock photographers

References

External links 
 Bigstock website

Stock photography
Photo archives in the United States
Privately held companies based in New York City